The Schaechter-Gottesman family is a leading family in Yiddish language and cultural studies.

Members include:
Lifshe Schaechter-Widman née Gottesman  (1893-1974) – author of Yiddish autobiography, folksinger
Beyle Schaechter-Gottesman (1920-2013) - Yiddish poet, songwriter and folksinger
Mordkhe Schaechter (1927-2007) - Yiddish expert, linguist, researcher, teacher, and writer
Charlotte (Charne) Schaechter née Saffian (1927-2014) - Yiddish piano accompanist and translator
Itzik Gottesman (1957-) - Yiddish journalist with The Forward; expert on Yiddish folklore
Rukhl Schaechter (1957-) - Yiddish journalist with The Forward; host of on-line cooking show, Est gezunterheyt
Gitl Schaechter-Viswanath (1958-) - Yiddish poet, and editor
Eydl Reznik née Schaechter (1962-) - Yiddish teacher and choir director, as well as artist
Binyumen Schaechter (1963-) - Yiddish composer, choral conductor, piano accompanist, and translator
Reyna Schaechter (1995-) - leading exponent of Yiddish song

See also 
 Gottesman (disambiguation)
 Schächter, Schechter

Jewish families
Bukovina Jews
Romanian families
Austrian families